Dhapasi is a  residentially preferred village and former Village Development Committee that is now part of Tokha Municipality, just outside the Kathmandu Ring Road, in Kathmandu District in Province No. 3 of central Nepal. At the time of the 2011 Nepal census it had a population of 31,406 and had 8,202 households in it.

References

Populated places in Kathmandu District